Brian Augustus Wethers (born December 17, 1980) is an American former professional basketball player. Wethers primarily played the small forward or shooting guard position. This career ended with a foot injury.

Basketball career

High school
Wethers graduated from Murrieta Valley High School in 1999.

College basketball
Wethers attended college at the University of California in Berkeley.

Professional career
After college, Wethers tore an Achilles tendon during a tryout for the Golden State Warriors.

Wethers played for Phantoms Braunschweig in Germany and Shandong in China in the 2003–2004 season.

He moved in 2004 to the Hunter Pirates in the Australian National Basketball League. Wethers was a standout for the Pirates during the 2004–2005 NBL season leading the league in scoring with 24.3 points a game and being named the NBL MVP. Wethers' strong play took the Pirates to the playoffs, after they had previously only won 2 matches the season before.

After the end of the NBL season Wethers moved to Hyères-Toulon in France where he played 24 matches during the 2005–2006 season.

He returned to the NBL in 2006 signing for the New Zealand Breakers, who had struggled in the league since their inception in 2003–2004.

Wethers was a fourth round selection in the 2007 NBA Development League Draft by the Bakersfield Jam, however he only played two matches before being released.

He moved to Ukraine in 2008, signing with BC Budivelnyk Kyiv.

In 2008 Wethers spent time at the Waikato Pistons in the New Zealand National Basketball League.

In 2009, he played for Antranik SC in Lebanon before in late 2009 moving to Uruguay to play for Club Malvín.

Wethers was signed in March 2010 to Khimik Yuzhny.

Post Basketball Career
Wethers is now the owner of Wethers' Elite Training. The company provides private training, camps, clinics, and travel team opportunities for boys and girls.

References

External links
Profile at Eurobasket.com

1980 births
Living people
American expatriate basketball people in Australia
American expatriate basketball people in China
American expatriate basketball people in Finland
American expatriate basketball people in France
American expatriate basketball people in Germany
American expatriate basketball people in Lebanon
American expatriate basketball people in New Zealand
American expatriate basketball people in Ukraine
American expatriate basketball people in Uruguay
American men's basketball players
Bakersfield Jam players
Basketball Löwen Braunschweig players
Basketball players from California
BC Budivelnyk players
BC Khimik players
California Golden Bears men's basketball players
Club Malvín basketball players
Hunter Pirates players
Namika Lahti players
New Zealand Breakers players
People from Carson, California
Shandong Hi-Speed Kirin players
Shooting guards
Small forwards
Sportspeople from Los Angeles County, California